Ali Baba and the Forty Thieves is an LP album by Bing Crosby made for children by Golden Records in 1957.  The Arthur Norman Choir and Orchestra provide support. The music was by Mary Rodgers and the lyrics by Sammy Cahn.
The album has been reissued by various record companies sometimes in a different edited form. The song "I Love You Whoever You Are" was issued as a single by Kapp Records (KAPP195) in October 1957.

The album was included on a CD titled “Once upon a Mattress” issued by Sepia Records in 2010.

Background
In the fall and winter of 1957, Golden Records issued a number of new children’s records. Bing Crosby was enlisted to read and sing four of the stories and in addition to Ali Baba and the Forty Thieves there were A Christmas Story - An Axe, An Apple and a Buckskin Jacket, Never Be Afraid and Jack B. Nimble – A Mother Goose Fantasy.

Reception
Billboard was positive. "At $2.98, with Bing and considerable ballyhoo, this can’t miss, especially on the racks. Tunes by Sammy Cahn and Mary Rodgers, are delightful, and Bing sings well. He also narrates in that inimitable, informal manner. More discriminating parents will object to the gore and certain elements of morality involved, but the mass market will not be deterred."

The New York Times commented: "Ali Baba and the Forty Thieves, with Crosby again at the controls, is a musical rendition of this old favorite from ‘The Arabian Nights’. The lyrics are by Sammy Cahn, the music by Mary Rodgers. They have combined to make some outstanding songs, especially one called ‘My Own Individual Star’.  Singing these songs, Crosby is his amiable self, but as a narrator he occasionally sounds as if he has not removed his pipe stem from his mouth!"

Crosby enthusiast and author Fred Reynolds had some reservations. "Neither music nor lyrics are in any way distinguished and Crosby’s singing offers nothing noteworthy, His narration, however, is good and it says something for his powers of persuasion that he invests this amoral and unwholesome tale with a modicum of charm…"

Track listing
Side One
 A long time ago in Persia (narration)
 Year In, Year Out
 Ali Baba always hoped (narration) / My Own Individual Star
 40 Thieves 40 (chorus)
 Open Sesame
 My Own Individual Star
Side Two
 Well now, Ali Baba’s brother, Kassim (narration)
 One Rich Brother
 Open Sesame! Kassim was trapped! (narration)
 One of us is a thief (chorus)
 I Love You Whoever You Are
 One Rich Brother
 They All Lived Happily Ever After

References 

1957 albums
Bing Crosby albums